Elections to Central Bedfordshire Council were held on 7 May 2015, along with the 2015 United Kingdom general election and other local elections. The whole council was up for election, with each successful candidate serving a four-year term of office, expiring in 2019.

The Conservative Party retained overall control of the council, winning 53 of the 59 seats on the council. Of the remaining 6 seats, 3 were won by Independents, 2 by the Labour Party and 1 by the Liberal Democrats.

Result

	
The overall turnout was 66.37% with a total of 258,389 valid votes cast. A total of 1,085 ballots were rejected in the 25 wards in which the number of rejected votes was reported.

Council Composition
Following the 2011 election, the composition of the council was:

After the election, the composition of the council was:

I - Independent 
L - Labour
LD - Liberal Democrats

Ward Results
Asterisks denote incumbent Councillors seeking re-election. Councillors seeking re-election were elected in 2011, and results are compared to that year's polls on that basis. All results are listed below:

Ampthill

A total of 123 ballots were rejected.

Arlesey

A total of 84 ballots were rejected.

Aspley and Woburn

A total of 33 ballots were rejected.

Barton-Le-Clay

A total of 13 ballots were rejected.

Biggleswade North

A total of 36 ballots were rejected.

Biggleswade South

A total of 25 ballots were rejected.

Caddington

A total of 46 ballots were rejected.

Cranfield & Marston Moretaine

A total of 24 ballots were rejected.

Dunstable Central

The number of ballots rejected was not reported by the council.

Dunstable Icknield

The number of ballots rejected was not reported by the council.

Dunstable Manshead

A total of 41 ballots were rejected.

Dunstable Northfields

The number of ballots rejected was not reported by the council.

Dunstable Watling

The number of ballots rejected was not reported by the council.

Eaton Bray

A total of 21 ballots were rejected.

Flitwick

A total of 57 ballots were rejected.

Heath & Reach

Mark Versallion was re-elected unopposed.

Houghton Conquest & Haynes

A total of 22 ballots were rejected.

Houghton Hall

A total of 65 ballots were rejected.

Leighton Buzzard North

A total of 102 ballots were rejected.

Leighton Buzzard South

A total of 73 ballots were rejected.

Linslade

A total of 71 ballots were rejected.

Northill

A total of 14 ballots were rejected.

Parkside

A total of 13 ballots were rejected.

Potton

A total of 33 ballots were rejected.

Sandy

A total of 37 ballots were rejected.

Shefford

A total of 31 ballots were rejected.

Silsoe & Shillington

A total of 23 ballots were rejected.

Stotfold & Langford

A total of 38 ballots were rejected.

Tithe Farm

A total of 34 ballots were rejected.

Toddington

A total of 25 ballots were rejected.

Westoning, Flitton & Greenfield

The number of ballots rejected was not reported by the council.

References

2015 English local elections
May 2015 events in the United Kingdom
2015